Sam Noir is a comic book mini-series written by Eric A. Anderson/Manny Trembley and illustrated by Manny Trembley, first published in September 2006.

Rendered in grayscale, the comic is a fusion of hardboiled noir fiction and a samurai adventure tale. While originally a three-issue mini-series, the comic's popularity and critical acclaim caused it to continue, with another 3-issue "Ronin holiday" mini-series getting published by Image's ShadowLine imprint (the last page indicates another mini to be published in June 2007 but as of early 2009 no new series has been announced).

Plot

Sam Noir, a ronin detective, is paid to track a young woman named Jasmine, and after watching her for a while begins to fall in love with her. After Jasmine's murder by ninjas, Sam starts to look for "Master Fuyu", the man who ordered her assassination.

Reception
Comics Bulletin calls Sam Noir's art "fantastic", but the story "more than a little derivative". Broken Frontier stated that "Anderson knows his hard-boiled style ... [making] the reading itself compelling—not to mention witty at times," while the art's "lyrical framing, evocative panel constructions, light and shadow effects [are] so well executed they’re like characters in the story".

Conversely, The X-Axis found the series "frustrating", stating that "it feels like there are two completely different, and better, comics struggling to get out - one which is much more funny, and one which takes [itself] entirely seriously".

Collected editions
 Sam Noir: Volume 1. Image Comics 2007-06-13.

Notes

References

See also 

 Video trailer:

External links
Full Issue: Sam Noir: Samurai Detective #1, Image Comics
PandaXpress! Anderson and Trembley's ongoing webcomic

Shadowline titles
Neo-noir comics
Image Comics limited series